Đinh Xuân Tiến (born 10 January 2003) is a Vietnamese footballer who plays as a midfielder for V-League (Vietnam) club Sông Lam Nghệ An and the Vietnam national under-23 team.

Honours
Vietnam U23
 AFF U-23 Championship: 2022

International career

International goals

U19

U23

External links

References

2003 births
Living people
Vietnamese footballers
V.League 1 players
Vietnam international footballers
Association football central defenders